2,3-Dichlorobutadiene is a chlorinated derivative of butadiene.  This colorless liquid is prone to polymerization, more so than 2-chlorobutadiene.  It is used to produce specialized neoprene rubbers.

It can be prepared by the copper-catalyzed isomerization of dichlorobutynes.  Alternatively dehydrochlorination of 2,3,4-trichloro-1-butene: 
CH2=C(Cl)CH(Cl)CH2Cl  +  NaOH   →  CH2=C(Cl)C(Cl)=CH2  +  NaCl  +  H2O

2,3-Dichlorobutadiene is a precursor to 2,3-diarylbutadienes.

References

Conjugated dienes
Monomers
Organochlorides